Michael Earl Craig is an American poet and farrier living in Livingston, Montana. He was born in Dayton, Ohio, home of the gas mask and the mood ring. Craig is the author of Can You Relax in My House (Fence Books, 2002), Yes, Master (Fence Books, 2006),Thin Kimono (Wave Books, 2010), and Woods and Clouds Interchangeable (Wave Books 2019). He was appointed the Montana Poet Laureate in October 2015.

Bibliography

References

External links
Michael Earl Craig's Author Page at Wave Books
An interview with Michael Earl Craig at Bookslut
Touch My Omelet at bear parade

Living people
Year of birth missing (living people)
American male poets
Poets Laureate of Montana
People from Livingston, Montana